Peltaster fructicola is an ascomycete fungus that is a plant pathogen of apples.

References

External links 
Index Fungorum
USDA ARS Fungal Database

Fungal plant pathogens and diseases
Apple tree diseases
Ascomycota enigmatic taxa